This is a list of FM radio stations in the United States having call signs beginning with the letters KQ through KS. Low-power FM radio stations, those with designations such as KQAT-LP, have not been included in this list.

KQ--

KR--

KS--

See also
 North American call sign

FM radio stations in the United States by call sign (initial letters KQ-KS)